Greenhead is a ward of Huddersfield in the metropolitan borough of Kirklees, West Yorkshire, England. It contains 258 listed buildings that are recorded in the National Heritage List for England. Of these, four are listed at Grade II*, the middle of the three grades, and the others are at Grade II, the lowest grade. The ward is to the west and north of the centre of town of Huddersfield, it is mainly residential, and includes the districts and suburbs of Birkby, Edgerton, Fartown, Gledholt, Highfields, Hillhouse, Longwood, Marsh, Paddock, and Thornton Lodge.

Most of the listed buildings are houses and associated structures, and these include many large houses along and near to the A629 road, which contains New North Road, Edgerton Road, and Halifax Road. In the ward are Greenhead Park and Edgerton Cemetery, and these contain listed buildings. The other listed buildings include churches and items in churchyards, an aqueduct and a lock on the Huddersfield Narrow Canal, a bridge over the River Colne, a viaduct, bridges and chutes associated with the railway, a milestone, a public house, mill buildings, a former tram shelter, a school, war memorials, and a telephone kiosk.


Key

Buildings

References

Citations

Sources

Lists of listed buildings in West Yorkshire
Buildings and structures in Huddersfield